Cephalaria alpina, commonly known as the yellow cephalaria, alpine scabious or yellow scabious, is a species of flowering plant in the family Caprifoliaceae native to the Alps in Europe.

Description
This plant shows pale yellow head-like inflorescences on the naked stems. The flowering period extends from June to August.

Distribution and habitat
This species is present in Western and Eastern Alps, in the northern Apennines and in the Swiss Jura.

It has been declared a weed in Australia.

Ecology
The flowers are visited by the white-tailed bumblebee (Bombus lucorum) and Bombus cryptarum.

References

Bibliography
 Gunter Steinbach (Hrsg.): Alpenblumen (Steinbachs Naturführer). Mosaik Verlag GmbH, München 1996, .
 Pignatti S. 1982 -Flora d'Italia. Bologna
 Zangheri P. 1976- Flora Italica. Padova
 Aeschimann D., Lauber K., Moser D.M., Theurillat J.P.,2004 - Flora Alpina. Bologna
 Conti F.,Abbate G.,Alessandrini A.,Blasi C., 2005 -An Annoted Checklist of the Italian Vascular Flora. Roma

alpina
Flora of the Alps
Plants described in 1753
Taxa named by Carl Linnaeus